Chowlaqlu (also Romanized as Chowlāqlū; also known as Cholaghloo, Cholakhlu, Cholāklū, and Cholāqlū) is a village in Qaflankuh-e Sharqi Rural District, Kaghazkonan District, Meyaneh County, East Azerbaijan Province, Iran. At the 2006 census, its population was 151, in 44 families.

References 

Populated places in Meyaneh County